Scurzolengo is a comune (municipality) in the Province of Asti in the Italian region Piedmont, located about  east of Turin and about  northeast of Asti.

Scurzolengo borders the following municipalities: Calliano, Castagnole Monferrato, and Portacomaro.

People
Piero Dusio (1899–1975), footballer, businessman and racing driver.

References

Cities and towns in Piedmont